Tolna tetrhemicycla   is a species of moth of the family Erebidae.

It is found in Cameroon.

References
Strand, E. 1915d. Einige exotische, insbesondere afrikanische Heterocera. - Archiv für Naturgeschichte 81(A)(2):129–134.

Erebinae